Sergey Georgievich Zakharov (May 1, 1950 – February 13, 2019) was a Russian singer who had a rare lyrical baritone.

Biography
Zakharov was born May 1, 1950, in Mykolaiv in the Ukrainian SSR (then part of the Soviet Union, now Ukraine) in a military family. In 1971 he entered the operetta department of the Gnessin State Musical College in Moscow in the class of  Margarita  Landa, and while still a student became the soloist of the State Variety Orchestra conducted by Leonid Utyosov.

In 1974 he was the winner of music competitions Golden Orpheus and Sopot International Song Festival.

Beginning in 1985, he worked independently, first with his own band, then since 1991, with pianist Alexander Kogan.

Curator of the International Festival of Russian Song of Great Britain since 2011.

He died on February 14, 2019, at the age of 68 in a hospital in Moscow from heart failure.

Awards
  Honored Artist of RSFSR (1988)
People's Artist of Russia (1996)
Repeated winner of Soviet, Russian and international competitions

Discography
 Sergei Zakharov Sings   
 Oh, You My Ancient Romance  
 Centripetal Force. Pop Songs 
 On Delicate Keys of the Soul 
 Russian Romances and Songs 
 About You and About Myself 
  You My Old Romance  
 Touch of Love 
 Oh, If I Could Express in a Sound... 
 Stay with Me 
 The Secret 
 Autumn Woman 
 The Best of  
 Listen to me My Dear... 
 I Come Out Alone On the Road... 
 Zakharov with   Kalinin

Videography
 Heavenly Swallows 
 Solo Concert 
 Unknown Zakharov 
 Star Show 
 Jubilee

References

External links 
 Official website
 

1950 births
2019 deaths
Russian singer-songwriters
Musicians from Mykolaiv
Russian male singer-songwriters
People's Artists of Russia
Baritones
Singers from Saint Petersburg
Honored Artists of the RSFSR
Soviet singer-songwriters
20th-century Russian male singers
Soviet male singer-songwriters
21st-century Russian male singers
20th-century Russian singers
21st-century Russian singers